Ali Mziyanda Funeka (born 28 March 1978) is a South African professional boxer. He held the IBO welterweight world title from 2014 to 2015, previously challenged three times for a lightweight world title between 2009 and 2010, and held the South African super featherweight title between 2004–2006 and in 2014.

Professional career

Funeka turned pro in 1995 at the 112 pound weight class.  After moving up in weight and fighting mostly journeymen, he stepped up in class to challenge Mzonke Fana for the South African super featherweight title in 2002.  Although he knocked Fana down in the 1st, Funeka lost a decision.  After winning several regional titles, Funeka rose to fame with an upset knockout win over Zahir Raheem in an IBF Lightweight Title Eliminator in 2008.

The following year he would lose to champion Nate Campbell.

Later in 2009, he challenged Joan Guzmán for the vacant IBF lightweight world title but the fight was ruled a draw, although many felt Funeka had won.

In 2010, Funeka fought Guzman for the same vacant title of their previous encounter. Because Guzman was 9 pounds above the lightweight limit, the title became only on line for Funeka. During the fight, the South African experienced a knockdown as well as being outpointed by Guzman who prevailed by majority decision. In the post-fight drug test, Funeka tested positive for hydrochlorothiazide, a diuretic banned by the Nevada State Athletic Commission (NSAC). To salvage him, Funeka's manager said the diuretic taken was given by a doctor who told them that it was not a banned substance. Nevertheless, the NSAC sentenced Funeka to a 9-month suspension  as well making him pay a fine of $35,000. Funeka also had to return the bonus money he earned from Guzman's "overweight" penalty.

On 19 November 2011, Funeka defeated Zolani Marali by split decision to capture the vacant WBF light-welterweight title in Johannesburg. The two met in a rematch the following year, on 8 December 2012, where Marali defeated Funeka by unanimous decision to win the WBF title.

On 15 November 2014, Funeka defeated Russian-German boxer Roman Belaev in a controversial technical decision for the vacant IBO welterweight world title. The fight was stopped due to a cut above Belaev's right eye, with the judges scoring the bout ,   in favor of Funeka.

On 10 December 2015, Funeka faced Australian Jeff Horn for the WBO Inter-Continental welterweight title in Auckland, New Zealand. He lost by technical knockout in the sixth round. The bout was a title eliminator for WBO world title held by Manny Pacquiao.

Professional boxing record

References

External links

1978 births
Living people
People from Mdantsane
Lightweight boxers
South African sportspeople in doping cases
Doping cases in boxing
South African male boxers
Welterweight boxers
International Boxing Organization champions
Light-welterweight boxers
Super-featherweight boxers
Sportspeople from the Eastern Cape